Jefferson Woodrow Upchurch (April 13, 1911 – October 23, 1971) was a Major League Baseball pitcher who played for parts of two seasons. He pitched for the Philadelphia Athletics for three games during  1935 and seven games during  1936. Upchurch played college baseball at Campbell University.

External links

1911 births
1971 deaths
Philadelphia Athletics players
Major League Baseball pitchers
Baseball players from North Carolina
Campbell Fighting Camels baseball players
People from Buies Creek, North Carolina